Mitochondrial 2-oxodicarboxylate carrier also known as solute carrier family 25 member 21 (SLC25A21) is a protein that in humans is encoded by the SLC25A21 gene.

It is a homolog of the S. cerevisiae ODC proteins, mitochondrial carriers that transport C5-C7 oxodicarboxylates across inner mitochondrial membranes. One of the species transported by ODC is 2-oxoadipate, a common intermediate in the catabolism of lysine, tryptophan, and hydroxylysine in mammals. Within mitochondria, 2-oxoadipate is converted into acetyl-CoA.

Model organisms 

Model organisms have been used in the study of SLC25A21 function. A conditional knockout mouse line, called Slc25a21tm1a(KOMP)Wtsi was generated as part of the International Knockout Mouse Consortium program — a high-throughput mutagenesis project to generate and distribute animal models of disease to interested scientists.

Male and female animals underwent a standardized phenotypic screen to determine the effects of deletion. Twenty one tests were carried out on homozygous mutant mice and ten significant abnormalities were observed, including sub-viability at weaning, decreased body weight, absent pinna reflex, abnormal snout, skull, spine and tooth morphology, atypical indirect calorimetry, body composition and plasma chemistry data, increased mean platelet volume and moderate elevations in auditory thresholds.

References

Further reading 
 
 
 
 

Human proteins
Solute carrier family
Genes mutated in mice